Bug Me Not!, - "Bugs Don't Know," is a 2005 Hong Kong film directed by Law Chi-Leung. Isabella Leong, portraying Moon in Bug Me Not!, was nominated for Best New Performer for the 25th Hong Kong Film Awards in 2006.

Plot
Moon is a young misfit who has the ability to talk to bugs. Moon has always been perceived as a "misfit" because she spoke baby talk too long. She has a crush on a boy named Hyland who works in a store owned by his father, across the street from her house. Unknown to Moon, Hyland has a serious problem with body contact with other people. Moon also meets Coochie, an endearing ladybug who speaks to her and becomes part of her daily life, advising her. Moon meets some children who also have abilities, including telekinetic twins, a high jumping teen, a fortune teller, and a boy with x-ray vision that is a semi-pervert. Leading these misfits is a woman named Auntie who looks early to mid 20s but her actual age is 70. Auntie wants both Moon and Hyland to join her band of misfits because of Moon's abilities and Hyland's ability to dodge from other people's attacks, i.e. superspeed.

Cast
 Isabella Leong (as Moon)
 Bolin Chen (as Hyland)
 Kenny Kwan (as Smarty)
 Steven Cheung (as Eggy)
 Xu Boping (as Baldy)
 Zhao Binqing (as Pearl)
 Zhai Yujie (as Jade)
 Jan Lamb (as Coochie (voice))
 Gillian Chung (as Auntie/Master)
 Charlene Choi (as Sasako)
 Candy Lo (as Moon's mom)
 Lawrence Cheng (as Hyland's dad)
 Tats Lau
 Alexander Chan
 Tse Chi-Wah

Awards and nominations
 Nominated: Golden Horse Awards for Best New Performer (Leong)
 Nominated: Hong Kong Film Award for Best New Performer (Leong)

See also
 List of Hong Kong films

References

External links

 

2005 films
Hong Kong romantic comedy films
2000s Cantonese-language films
2000s romantic fantasy films
2000s romance films
Films directed by Law Chi-leung